Castlepoint is a shopping centre in Strouden Park, Bournemouth, Dorset, in the United Kingdom, occupying a  site containing around 40 shops, including major retailers such as Marks & Spencer, New Look, H&M, Asda, Sainsbury's, and B&Q. It is situated  north-east from the centre of town, off Castle Lane West on the former site of The Hampshire Centre.

History 
The centre opened to the public on 27 October 2003, following a major redevelopment of the site, which had previously been occupied by The Hampshire Centre for around 35 years. Construction of the centre, undertaken by Kier Group, took over two years and cost some £275 million. The annual Pancake Race takes place to raise money for good causes each year.

On 31 August 2022, it was reported by the Bournemouth Daily Echo that 50% of the shopping centre had been sold by shareholders.

Car park problems 

Shortly after the centre opened, concerns about the condition of the car park came to public attention when B&Q was forced to temporarily cease trading while the safety of the car park was determined. In May 2005 temporary safety netting was erected in the lower deck area of the east car park and around 1,000 parking spaces were closed to the public after concrete fell from the roof. By 26 May 2005, these parking spaces had re-opened, although the netting remained in place.

On 1 December 2005, the car park was again closed to the public following further safety concerns. This led to the temporary closure of all stores within the main site. The stores within the East and West Village were unaffected by this closure and remained open, although parking for these stores was limited. Whilst the centre was closed a free park and ride scheme was introduced to take shoppers to alternative shops within Bournemouth town centre. Following repair work, the car parking spaces and stores in the main centre were re-opened to the public in a phased manner between 20 December 2005 and 13 February 2006.

Although the car park was made safe with the insertion of props and the stores in the centre re-opened (and remain so), the longer term solution for rebuilding the carpark is still to be resolved. In December 2014 the centre was given permission by the local council to rebuild the car parks in a phased manned over the next three years, due to be completed by Christmas 2018. The work is to be completed in 5 separate blocks to minimise disruption to shoppers and tenants.

In 2020, despite the COVID-19 pandemic in the United Kingdom, the car park was still in the process of being rebuilt.  As of December 2022, the rebuilding of the car park is still in progress.

Retailers 
Since opening in 2003, several stores have ceased trading at the centre such as Principles, Virgin Megastores, Suits Direct, All Sports, Barratts, Choices Video and Lunn Poly (later Thomson). After the sale of Virgin Megastores in the United Kingdom, the stores were re-branded as Zavvi and after going into administration in 2009, had some of their sites sold to HMV, which operated the site at Castlepoint until 2013, following the closure of some HMV UK stores.

Castlepoint has a wide range of retailers including Sainsburys, TKMaxx, Robert Dyas, CeX, H&M, WHSmith, ASDA, B&Q, Clintons, Clarks, Waterstones, Superdrug, Marks and Spencer, Foot Locker, Accesorize, River Island, Mountain Warehouse, JD Sports, New Look, Boots, EE, Lakeland, The Entertainer, Barclays, NatWest and Easy Bathrooms.

There are also a handful of restaurants and places to eat at the site too. These include Caffe Nero, Costa Coffee, McDonald's, Starbucks, Five Guys, KFC, Nando's, Sainsbury's Café and M&S Café.

Four shops at the site at the site are currently empty as of January 2022. These shops are Argos, GAP and the Topshop retailers.

A branch of Mountain Warehouse opened in a larger store December 2022. In 2023, Nike applied to pen a store in the former Gap unit. In March 2023, Holland & Barrett will open a branch in the old Mountain Warehouse.

Awards 
2005 Purple Apple Marketing Award for its Think Big! campaign.
2007 Safer Business Award.

Gallery

References 

Buildings and structures in Bournemouth
Shopping centres in Dorset
Shopping malls established in 2003